There are two different kana (Japanese script) representations for the romanization va:
 ヴァ: U (ウ) with dakuten (voicing marks), followed by a small A (ア)
 less commonly ヷ: Wa (ワ) with dakuten